August Bischler (29 April 1865 – 26 May 1957) was a Russian Empire-born ethnic Crimea German chemist who later emigrated to Switzerland. He discovered the Bischler–Möhlau indole synthesis reaction in 1892 and, together with Bernard Napieralski, discovered the Bischler–Napieralski reaction in 1893.

Life
He received his Ph.D. at the University of Zurich 1889 worked at the University of Zurich and from 1899 at the University of Basel. After becoming a Swiss citizen in 1925 he worked in the chemical industry in Geneva.

Bernard Napieralski

Bernard Napieralski was a Ph.D. student of Bischler at the University of Zurich in 1893. Napieralski was born in Ostrowy, Poland, 1861.

References
 

1865 births
1957 deaths
Chemists from the Russian Empire
University of Zurich alumni
Emigrants from the Russian Empire to Switzerland
20th-century Swiss chemists